Sir John Budd Phear (9 February 1825 - 1905) was a judge and author who was the 13th Chief Justice of Ceylon. He was appointed on 18 October 1877 succeeding William Hackett and was Chief Justice until 1879. He was succeeded by Richard Cayley. When Phear retired Harry Dias Bandaranaike acted as Chief Justice for 12 days.

Phear was the eldest of three sons of John Phear, rector of Earl Stonham. One of his brothers, Samuel George Phear, became Master of Emmanuel College, Cambridge.
John Phear also stood as the Liberal parliamentary candidate for Honiton in the reformed 1885 borough elections but ultimately lost to Sir John Kennaway, Conservative candidate and never stood for the seat again.

Works
 Lecture on the Rules of Evidence in Indian Courts of Law … delivered before the Bethune Society on 8th March, 1866 J. C. Hay & Co.: Calcutta, 1866.
 The Hindoo Joint Family. A lecture, etc. G. C. Hay & Co.: Calcutta, 1867.
 Indian Famines and Village Organization. A paper, etc. London.-III. East India Association: 1877
 The Aryan Village in India and Ceylon. London 1880 (Reprint Neu Delhi, 1975) (online; PDF; 8.3 MB)
 International Trade, and the relation between exports and imports. A paper, etc. Macmillan & Co.: London, 1881.

References

1825 births
1905 deaths
Chief Justices of British Ceylon
19th-century Sri Lankan people
19th-century British people
British expatriates in Sri Lanka
Sri Lankan people of English descent
Presidents of The Asiatic Society
British people in colonial India
Writers about India